Dan West (1893–1971) was the founder of Heifer International, a charitable organization dedicated to relieving hunger and poverty, as well as being involved in starting several other programs associated with the Church of the Brethren. He was an advocate for Christian pacifism and a conscientious objector.

Biography 
A native of Ohio, born in 1893, West was a member of the Church of the Brethren and graduated from Manchester University (Indiana) in 1917. As a church man from Indiana, West spent two years as a conscientious objector during World War I. After working for the Emergency Peace Campaign in 1936, he traveled to Spain to serve as the director of a relief program in the Spanish Civil War. He grew weary of handing out rationed supplies and thought there had to be a better way of eliminating hunger. He gave the idea to his neighbors and many congregations in northern Indiana of donating young heifers to families in need. The involvement from his community led him to bigger dreams. His idea became an official program of the Church of the Brethren in 1942 and eventually became an independent nonprofit corporation in 1953. His phrase "not a cup of milk, but a cow" became the mantra for Heifer International, which continues on today.

Upon returning to the United States, West pushed for two more programs to be created. Alongside Alma Long, he was a key person in helping to develop the Brethren Volunteer Service (BVS) in 1948.  The BVS acted as an alternative to military service for war objectors beginning in World War II.  At Manchester University, West spoke to the president of the University and, together, they convinced Gladdys Muir to launch the nation's first undergraduate program in peace studies at Manchester University.

Further reading 
 Glee Yoder Passing on the Gift : The Story of Dan West (Paperback) The Brethren Press, 1978 (reprinted 1995)

Notes

External links
Church of the Brethren Network
Heifer International
Manchester University

1893 births
1971 deaths
Manchester University (Indiana) alumni
American humanitarians
People from Indiana
American Christian pacifists
American members of the Church of the Brethren
20th-century philanthropists